Bharatsinh Parmar   is an Indian politician.
He is a former member of the Rajya Sabha and a leader of the Bharatiya Janata Party. He was elected to Rajya Sabha from Gujarat in 2008.

References 

Living people
Rajya Sabha members from Gujarat
People from Gujarat
Year of birth missing (living people)
Bharatiya Janata Party politicians from Gujarat